Crespo is a Spanish, Portuguese and Italian surname and a place name, meaning "curly". A more common Italian form of the surname is Crespi. It may refer to:

People

General
Alejandro Crespo, Argentine trade unionist, general secretary of SUTNA since 2016
Alphonse Crespo, Swiss orthopedic surgeon
Ana Crespo (born 1948), Spanish lichenologist
Andrea Crespo (artist) (born 1993), New York-based artist
Andrea Crespo (writer) (born 1983), Ecuadorian writer
Andrés Crespo (actor) (born 1970), Ecuadorian actor
Ángel Crespo (1926–1995), Spanish poet and translator
António Cândido Gonçalves Crespo (1846–1883), Brazilian-born Portuguese poet
Audrey Crespo-Mara (born 1976), French journalist and television presenter 
Clotilde Crespo de Arvelo (1887–?), Venezuelan poet and novelist
Daniel Fernández Crespo (1901–1964), Uruguayan political figure
Diane Crespo (born 1961), U.S. film producer and director
Domingo Crespo (1793–1871), Argentine politician
Eduardo Alonso-Crespo (born 1956), Argentine opera composer
Elvis Crespo (Díaz, born 1971), Puerto Rican-American merengue singer
Enrique Barón Crespo (born 1944), Spanish politician, economist, and lawyer
Ernesto Horacio Crespo (born ?), Argentine brigadier general
Esteban Crespo (1911-date of death unknown), Mexican athlete
Evaristo Crespo Azorín (1863–1941), Spanish lawyer, politician and professor
Fred Crespo (born ?), U.S. (Illinoisan) politician
Gilberto Crespo y Martínez (1853–1917), Mexican diplomat and writer
Gonçalves Crespo (1846–1883), Brazilian-born Portuguese poet
Gonzalo Ramiro del Castillo Crespo (1936-2019), Bolivian Roman Catholic Archbishop of La Paz
Hernán Crespo Toral (1937–2008), Ecuadorian architect, archeologist and museologist
Ismael Crespo Martínez, political scientist and expert in Latin America
Jaime Crespo (born 1961), U.S. artist, musician, and writer
Jimmy Crespo (born 1954), U.S. guitarist
Joaquín Crespo (Torres, 1841–1898), Venezuelan politician and soldier
José Crespo (disambiguation), various people
Jorge Juan Crespo de la Serna (1887–1978), Mexican artist, art critic, and historian
Julio Crespo MacLennan, Spanish academic, historian and published author
June Crespo (born 1982), Spanish artist
Luis Cordero Crespo (Cordero y Crespo, 1833–1912), Ecuadorian president (1892–'95)
Manuel Revollo Crespo (1925–2014), Roman Catholic auxiliary bishop of the Archdiocese of Cochabamba, Bolivia
María Isabel Crespo de Lebed (born 1960), Ecuadorian journalist, reporter, and news presenter
Marcos Crespo (born 1980), U.S. (New Yorker) politician
María del Carmen Crespo Díaz (born ?), Spanish politician
Mário Crespo (born 1947), Portuguese journalist and reporter
Mauricio Pozo Crespo (born 1959), Ecuadorian politician, banker and economist 
Paul Crespo (born 1964), U.S. political commentator, consultant, and activist
Remigio Crespo Toral (1860–1939), Ecuadorian writer
Rodrigo Crespo (born 1979), Argentine musician, producer, songwriter, and performer
Rolando Crespo (born 1975), Puerto Rican politician
Victor Crespo (1932–2014), Portuguese politician
Yadira Serrano Crespo (born 1976), Mexican politician  affiliated with the Party of the Democratic Revolution
Yosuán Crespo (born 1984), Cuban businessman and computer scientist
Andrea Crespo (writer) (born 1983), Ecuadorian writer

Spanish Counts of Castillo Fiel
Alfonso Crespo, 6th Count of Castillo Fiel (fl. 1873–1910)
Carlos Crespo, 7th Count of Castillo Fiel (1911–1963)
Eduardo Crespo, 8th Count of Castillo Fiel (fl. 1963–1989)

Sports
Albert Torras Crespo (born 1996), Spanish football midfielder
Alberto Crespo (1920–1991), Argentine race car driver
Andrés Crespo (born 1968), Spanish Olympian fencer
Antoine Crespo (born 1955), Andorran alpine skier
César Crespo (born 1979), Puerto Rican baseball player
Cristóbal Márquez Crespo (born 1984), Spanish footballer 
David Alexandre Pereira Crespo (born 1994), Portuguese footballer
Édgar Crespo (born 1989), Panamanian Olympian swimmer
Felipe Crespo (born 1973), Puerto Rican baseball player
Hernán Crespo (born 1975), Argentine footballer
Iñaki Gastón Crespo (born 1963), Spanish road bicycle racer
Israel Crespo (1986–2007), Puerto Rican boxer
Iván Crespo (born 1984), Spanish footballer
Javier Crespo, Spanish Paralympic swimmer
Jesus Muñoz Crespo (1899–1979), Portuguese footballer
Joan Crespo (born 1988), Spanish slalom canoer
José Crespo (disambiguation), various people
Joseph Crespo, French rugby union and rugby league footballer who played in the 1940s and 1950s
Miguel Crespo da Silva (born 1996), Portuguese professional footballer 
Milagros Crespo (born 1979), Cuban Olympic beach volleyball player
Rogelio Crespo (1894–1985), Cuban baseball player
Salvador Crespo (born 1983), Spanish distance runner

Places
Crespo, Entre Ríos, Argentine city in the province of Entre Ríos
Crespo mine, Peruvian silver mine in the Ayacucho region
Crespo Municipality, Venezuelan municipality in the state of Lara
Ejutla de Crespo, Mexican city and a municipality in the state of Oaxaca
José Crespo Y Castillo District, Peruvian district in the province of Leoncio Prado
Preto do Crespo River, Brazilian river in the state of Rondônia
Rio Crespo, Brazilian municipality in the state of Rondônia
Villa Crespo, Argentine neighbourhood of Buenos Aires
Villa Crespo y San Andrés, Uruguayan town in the department of Canelones

Other
Nexus S, Android phone with the codename Crespo

See also
Crespos, Spanish municipality
Crespos (Braga), Portuguese parish